Lepidagathis alopecuroidea, synonym  Teliostachya alopecuroidea, the pata de gallina, is a plant with a wide distribution in the Americas (from southern Mexico to northern Paraguay) and Africa (from west tropical Africa to east Tanzania and Angola).

See also
 List of plants of Cerrado vegetation of Brazil

References

External links
 Teliostachya alopecuroidea

Acanthaceae
Flora of Mexico
Flora of South America
Flora of Africa